The 2006 United States Senate election in Wyoming was held November 7, 2006. The primaries were on August 22, 2006, in which both candidates were unopposed. Incumbent Republican Craig Thomas won re-election to a third term. Thomas died 5 months into his term on June 4, 2007 after battling leukemia.

Democratic primary

Candidates 
 Dale Groutage, engineer

Results

Republican primary

Candidates 
 Craig Thomas, incumbent U.S. Senator

Results

General election

Candidates 
 Dale Groutage (D), engineer
 Craig Thomas (R), incumbent U.S. Senator

Campaign 
Thomas was a very popular two term incumbent, having a 68% approval rating. Despite doing very well in the polls, Thomas agreed to a debate. An October debate was sponsored by the Casper Star-Tribune and KCWY in Casper. Thomas said the nation has made progress in its energy policy, while Groutage said the nation's energy policy has failed because Congress has done more for special interests than the people.

Debates 
Complete video of debate, October 22, 2006

Predictions

Polling

Results 

Thomas won at least 56% of the vote in every county in Wyoming.

See also 
 2006 United States Senate elections

References 

Wyoming
2006
2006 Wyoming elections